Kokořín Castle is a castle located in Kokořín in the Central Bohemian Region of the Czech Republic. It was built in the first half of the 14th century by order of Hynek Berka of Dubá. It was heavily damaged during the Hussite Wars and stood in ruins until the reconstruction campaign of 1911–1918. It was nationalized in 1948 and has been designated a national cultural landmark since 2001. The Kokořínsko – Máchův kraj Protected Landscape Area takes its name from this castle.

External links

Kokořín castle on zamky-hrady.cz
Virtual show

Mělník District
Castles in the Central Bohemian Region
National Cultural Monuments of the Czech Republic